Wilhelm van der Vyver (born 22 September 1989 in Grabouw) is a South African sprinter who specializes in the 100 metres.

Achievements

References

External links
 

1989 births
Living people
South African male sprinters
Universiade medalists in athletics (track and field)
Universiade bronze medalists for South Africa
Medalists at the 2009 Summer Universiade